Midtown is one of four central business districts outside the city's downtown core of Toronto, Ontario, Canada. Located in the north of Old Toronto, its borders are roughly defined by St. Clair Avenue to the south and Eglinton Avenue or Lawrence Avenue to the north, Bayview Avenue to the east and Dufferin Street to the west. The central neighbourhood of the area is Yonge–Eglinton.

Neighbourhoods
Rosedale, Forest Hill, Deer Park and Summerhill are generally defined as the most upscale cluster of neighbourhoods in the City (rivalled only by the central portion of Lawrence Ave.). The intersection of Yonge and St. Clair (located in Deer Park) is the historic commercial centre for these neighbourhoods.  It is home to the historic and pastoral Mount Pleasant Cemetery and the hidden St. Michael's Cemetery.

Davisville Village encompasses the area east of Yonge Street to the west side of Bayview Avenue, and south from Eglinton to Merton Street, overlooking the park-like setting of Mount Pleasant Cemetery.  It is home to many residential high-rise apartments and boutique shops. Its many large Victorian and Tudor-style homes are among the most expensive residences in the city. In 2008, the Mount Pleasant Village BIA was established and has been a significant asset in the evolution of the area whilst maintaining the heritage integrity of the buildings.

With the exception of Merton Street, Davisville's lack of new high-rise condominium developments preserves a look and feel similar to that found in Toronto's other upscale low-rise neighbourhoods such as Lawrence Park, The Beaches and The Kingsway.

The centre of midtown and one of Toronto's four major city centres, "Yonge and Eg" is the junction of North Toronto (east and west of Yonge, north of Eglinton), the northern edges of Davisville (southeast) and Chaplin Estates (southwest).  The immediate area includes several high-rise office buildings, the busy Eglinton Station, and a large mall-office complex. It is home to numerous restaurants, two multiplex cinemas, and a diverse retail strip. Since about 2000, this region has been undergoing a surge in commercial and residential development and a massive influx of young urban professional singles and families.

Neighbourhoods in Toronto
Central business districts in Canada